Cayan Tower, known as Infinity Tower before it was inaugurated, is a , 75-story skyscraper in Dubai, United Arab Emirates by Cayan Real Estate Investment and Development. The tower is designed by Skidmore, Owings and Merrill SOM architectural group. Upon its opening on 10 June 2013, the tower became the world's tallest high-rise building with a twist of 90 degrees. This record has since been surpassed by the Shanghai Tower, which opened in February 2015.

Design

The twisting design of Cayan Tower was achieved by rotating each floor 1.2 degrees around a cylindrical elevator and service core. Prior to its name change to Cayan, the tower carried various names to describe its original shape.  The unique design was supported by a dynamic analysis that studied the potential performance of the tower under wind, seismic, and other dynamic loads. Cayan Tower's apartments are designed with reconstituted wooden floors, Chinese synthetic marble counter tops, and kitchen fixtures. The tower also includes a five-story parking garage behind it.
The rooms of the tower are designed in such a way that it would not be affected by direct sunlight due to titanium-colored metal panels on cast-in-place concrete columns aided with repetitive staggered screen panels to stop penetrating sunlight from disturbing the residents of the unit. The lack of balcony space helps with the feeling of enclosure and passive solar shading.

Site flooding
The tower's construction was on hold for a year and a half after the foundation site of the tower was flooded when the wall that held back the Dubai Marina was breached on 7 February 2007. Witnesses described a loud cracking sound, followed by an inflow of sand and water. The project resumed construction in July 2008.

Official launch ceremony
The Cayan Tower was inaugurated with fireworks accompanied with laser light display on the tower on 10 June 2013 and become the world's tallest twisted tower, surpassing Turning Torso. The tower was renamed from Infinity Tower to Cayan Tower as the developer of the tower said:

Gallery

See also
 Dubai Marina
 List of tallest buildings in Dubai
 List of tallest residential buildings in the world
 List of tallest buildings in the United Arab Emirates
 List of twisted buildings

References

External links

 
 Infinitytower.com
 
 
 
 Snopes Article on collapse of wall
 Photographs of Site after wall collapse

Twisted buildings and structures
Residential skyscrapers in Dubai
Buildings and structures in Dubai
Residential buildings completed in 2013
Skidmore, Owings & Merrill buildings
2013 establishments in the United Arab Emirates
Architecture in Dubai
High-tech architecture